Mrs. Lehmann's Daughters is a 1932 German comedy film directed by Carl Heinz Wolff and starring Hansi Niese, Hertha Thiele, and Else Elster. It was shot at the Terra Studios in Berlin. It is a remake of the 1925 silent film Three Waiting Maids. A Swedish remake Marriageable Daughters was produced the following year.

Cast

References

Bibliography 
 
 Klaus, Ulrich J. Deutsche Tonfilme: Jahrgang 1932. Klaus-Archiv, 1988.

External links 
 

1932 comedy films
German comedy films
1932 films
Films of the Weimar Republic
1930s German-language films
Films directed by Carl Heinz Wolff
Terra Film films
Remakes of German films
Sound film remakes of silent films
German black-and-white films
1930s German films
Films shot at Terra Studios